Al-Musharifah is a neighbourhood in Jeddah, Saudi Arabia.

In the late 1960s Al-Musharifah was one of the newest residential areas in the city. At that period of time, patches of open desert wasteland were located between the houses of Al-Musharifah; local children played games on those parcels of desert. At the time of the neighbourhood's opening, the roads were not paved.

Notable residents
Osama bin Laden and his family moved to Al-Musharifah several years after bin Laden first enrolled at the Al-Thager Model School.

Sources
 Coll, Steve. The Bin Ladens: An Arabian Family in the American Century. New York City: The Penguin Press, 2008.

References

Neighbourhoods in Jeddah